Where It's At is a 1969 American drama film written and directed by Garson Kanin and starring David Janssen, Rosemary Forsyth, Robert Drivas, Brenda Vaccaro and Don Rickles. The film was released on May 7, 1969, by United Artists.

Plot
A.C. Smith owns and runs the Caesars Palace hotel and casino in Las Vegas. As pleased as he is to have grown son Andy pay a visit, he wishes Andy would express some interest in women or the hotel, two things A.C. values above all else.

Andy stays to learn the business after losing a cut of cards to his dad. He soon begins flirtations with Molly and Diana, who respectively happen to be his dad's secretary and mistress. A chip off the old block, Andy saves the hotel for A.C. by winning a game of chance. He ends up with Molly, and his dad ends up with the family business in good hands.

Cast
 David Janssen as A.C.
 Rosemary Forsyth as Diana
 Robert Drivas as Andy	
 Brenda Vaccaro as Molly 
 Don Rickles as Willie
 Edy Williams as Phyllis
 Anthony Holland as Henry
 Vince Howard as Ralph 	
 Warrene Ott as Betty Avery 
 The Committee as Themselves

See also
 List of American films of 1969
 List of films set in Las Vegas

References

External links
 

1969 films
1940s English-language films
American drama films
1969 drama films
United Artists films
Films directed by Garson Kanin
1960s English-language films
1960s American films